The Nigerien Democratic Front (FDN) was a political party in Niger. It published the party journal L'Unité ('Unity').

History
The party was founded by Zodi Ikhia and his followers on March 6, 1957, assembling the remainder of the Union of Nigerien Independents and Sympathisers. It became a Nigerien affiliate of the African Convention, an inter-territorial political party led by Léopold Sédar Senghor.

The FDN contested the March 1957 Territorial Assembly elections, but received 0.5% of the vote and failed to win a seat.

References

Defunct political parties in Niger
Political parties established in 1957
1957 establishments in Niger